"Fear of the Dark" is a song by British heavy metal band Iron Maiden. Written by Steve Harris, the band's bass player and primary songwriter, it serves as the title track to Iron Maiden's 1992 album Fear of the Dark.

The song has been covered by several different artists. In 2008, it was covered by Fightstar for Kerrang! magazine's Maiden Heaven tribute album.

The Flight 666 version of the song was released as downloadable content for the Rock Band video game series on 9 June 2009.

Lyrics
The song's lyrics tell the story of a man who has always been intensely afraid of the dark. He recalls the many times he has walked alone, and recollections of the feeling of being followed while walking at night. Strictly, the song is about paranoid ideas (fear of being watched or harmed by other persons) rather than phobia (fear of objects and situations), even though the latter is referred to in the lyrics ("Have a phobia that someone's always there"); darkness seems to be the context rather than the reason for the fear. 

According to Bruce Dickinson, Steve Harris wrote this song because he himself was really afraid of the dark.

Personnel
Bruce Dickinson – vocals
Dave Murray – lead guitar
Janick Gers – rhythm guitar
Steve Harris – bass
Nicko McBrain – drums

Album appearances

Covers 

 Graveworm, for their 2001 album Scourge of Malice (often incorrectly attributed to Cradle of Filth or Children of Bodom).
 Alternative rock band Fightstar performed a cover of the song for the Kerrang! Maiden Heaven tribute album.
 Metal band Lonely The Brave covered the song and released as track 4 of Maiden Heaven Volume 2 tribute album in Kerrang Magazine Issue 1623.
 It was performed by Chuck Billy, Craig Goldy, Ricky Phillips, and Mikkey Dee for the tribute album Numbers from the Beast.
The Finnish Metal/Rock band Sturm und Drang performed a cover of this song on their 2008 release Rock N' Roll Children as a bonus track 
 A cappella metal band Van Canto covered it on their second album Hero.
 Doro Pesch performed with Blaze Bayley on a Classical live version in 2004 at Wacken Open Air with strings and acoustic guitars.
 Pentagram (a.k.a. Mezarkabul) (only live).

Live single

A live version of the song was released on 1 March 1993 to promote A Real Live One, a live album featuring recordings from various concerts throughout the Fear of the Dark Tour. This song was recorded at the Helsinki Ice Hall on 27 August 1992. It is the 26th single released by the band, reaching number 8 in the UK charts.

Different tracks taken from the same album served as B-sides, including "Bring Your Daughter... to the Slaughter", "Be Quick or Be Dead", and "Tailgunner", in addition to "Hooks in You", recorded in 1990 during the No Prayer on the Road tour. The initial pressing of the 7" cut-to-shape vinyl picture disc listed "Hooks in You" as the B-side but actually played "Tailgunner".  This mis-press was quickly corrected by EMI on future pressings.

"Fear of the Dark" was nominated for a Grammy Award in 1994 in the "Best Metal Performance" category, but lost to "I Don't Want to Change the World" by Ozzy Osbourne.

The single's cover art features Eddie playing Steve Harris' signature Fender Precision Bass.

Track listing
7" poster bag single

7" picture disc

Italy 12" maxi single

UK CD maxi single

Italy and Holland CD maxi single

Chart performance

In popular culture

Film
In Fear Street Part One: 1994, the character Josh Johnson wears an Iron Maiden shirt and is shown listening to the song Fear of the Dark.

References 

1992 songs
1993 singles
Iron Maiden songs
Songs written by Steve Harris (musician)
EMI Records singles